Llupia is a commune in the Pyrénées-Orientales department in southern France.

Geography 
Llupia is located in the canton of Les Aspres and in the arrondissement of Perpignan.

Toponymy 
The historical name in Catalan is Llupià.

History

Government and politics

Mayors

Population

See also
Communes of the Pyrénées-Orientales department

References

Communes of Pyrénées-Orientales